Simon James Hoare (born 28 June 1969) is a British Conservative Party politician. He has been the Member of Parliament (MP) for North Dorset since May 2015.

Education
Hoare was educated at the Bishop Hannon High School, Cardiff, a Roman Catholic comprehensive school, then Greyfriars, Oxford, where he gained a BA degree in Modern History.

Professional career
Hoare worked at Conservative Central Office before becoming the personal assistant to the Conservative leader of Kingston upon Thames London Borough Council. Hoare has worked as a political officer at the Bow Group and is a member of the Tory Reform Group.

He began his public relations career in the 1990s when he joined Charles Barker. Following that he worked as head of property at Ketchum, as an account director at PPS Group and as an external affairs director at the Environmental Services Association.

Following this, Hoare began his own public relations and lobbying company, Community Connect, of which he was managing director. Following the 2010 general election, Hoare became a director in the public affairs arm of Four Communications.

Hoare has also been a member of the Council of Governors of the South Central Ambulance Service NHS Trust.

In July 2021 Hoare made a tweet about bonfires that appeared to be mocking Northern Ireland Unionists. The tweet received widespread condemnation.

Political career
Hoare was a Conservative cabinet member on West Oxfordshire District Council, a councillor on Oxfordshire County Council and was also a member of the executive of Witney Conservative Association working alongside the then Prime Minister David Cameron. He contested Cardiff West at the 1997 general election, and Cardiff South and Penarth at the 2010 general election, coming second to Labour's Alun Michael.

Hoare was elected Member of Parliament for North Dorset at the 2015 general election, increasing his predecessor, Robert Walter's, majority from 7,625 to 21,118 votes.

Hoare was opposed to Brexit prior to the 2016 referendum.

In September 2018 Hoare was appointed Parliamentary Private Secretary to the Home Secretary, Sajid Javid.

In June 2019, Hoare was elected as the chair of the Northern Ireland Affairs Select Committee.

In May 2020 he asked Dominic Cummings to consider his position as the PM's advisor due to Cummings travelling from London to Durham during a nationwide coronavirus lockdown.

In November 2021, he was one of 13 Conservative MPs who voted against a government-supported amendment to defer the suspension of Conservative MP Owen Paterson who was found to have breached lobbying rules.

Election literature
In 2015, Private Eye reported that on his election leaflets Hoare said that "My family and I live in the constituency, use local schools and are part of the community." He had only recently moved to the constituency by the time that the leaflets had been distributed. It was stated that he was only selected to contest the seat in January and as late as 11 April 2015, an article in the Bournemouth Daily Echo reported that he was planning to move to the constituency. It was also reported that Hoare told the Bournemouth Daily Echo that he was "not a professional politician", which was contrary to his employment history in various pro-Conservative Party organisations.

He was similarly criticised by the South Wales Echo when he stood in Cardiff South and Penarth at the 2010 general election.

References

External links

1969 births
Living people
Alumni of Greyfriars, Oxford
Conservative Party (UK) MPs for English constituencies
UK MPs 2015–2017
UK MPs 2017–2019
UK MPs 2019–present
Politicians from Cardiff
Conservative Party (UK) councillors
Councillors in Oxfordshire